"The Embargo" is a historical poem written by the American poet William Cullen Bryant in 1808, when he was thirteen years old. Bryant was a critic of Jeffersonian political philosophy, and the work was his attempt to satirize a widely unpopular shipping embargo imposed by Thomas Jefferson at the time. Jefferson's embargo failed, ultimately helping precipitate the War of 1812.

External links

American poems
1808 poems